Julian Christiaan Brandes (born 11 May 2004) is a Dutch footballer who plays for Jong Ajax of the Eerste Divisie as a midfielder.

Career
Brandes joined the Ajax youth system on his eighth birthday in 2012. Brandes has had to overcome injuries, including missing alot of the 2019-20 season. Despite this he has been identified as a promising player within the Ajax system. Brandes was granted his first professional contract with Ajax on his eighteenth birthday in May 2022. It was a three-year contract to take him with the club until June 30, 2025 and includes the option for an extra year. 

In the summer of 2022 Brandes trained with the Ajax first team during pre-season training. He made his unofficial debut playing in pre-season friendlies, and was on the substitutes bench for Jong Ajax at the start of the 2022-23 season. However, a leg injury caused him to miss months of action. Brandes made his professional debut for Jong Ajax on March 17, 2023 in a 2-0 defeat against Almere City in the Eerste Divisie.

References

External links
 

Living people
2004 births
Dutch footballers
Eerste Divisie players
Association football midfielders
Jong Ajax players